Mountain and moorland  ponies form a group of several breeds of ponies and small horses native to the British Isles.  Many of these breeds are derived from semiferal ponies kept on moorland or heathland, and some of them still live in this way, as well as being kept as fully domesticated horses for riding, driving, and other draught work, or for horse showing.

Mountain and moorland classes at horse shows in the British Isles cover most of the breeds; however, the four closely related Welsh breeds often form their own classes.

Traditionally, the modern mountain and moorland ponies have been regarded as including nine breeds (the four Welsh types being counted as one). Larger native British Isles horses (such as the various large draught breeds) are not regarded as belonging to the mountain and moorland group.

Characteristics
Mountain and moorland ponies are generally stocky in build, with flowing manes and tails. They are very hardy and are ‘good doers’, needing relatively little feed to live on. They are prone to obesity and  if allowed to graze freely on lush forage may develop health problems, including laminitis. Shetlands are smaller, not to exceed . Shetlands are measured in inches. Some breeds, such as the Exmoor, are uniform in colour and pattern but others permit a wide range of colours. However the Shetland is the only breed that can be skewbald or piebald, though even Shetlands cannot be spotted.

Semiferal ponies
Several types of mountain and moorland pony still live in a semiferal state on unenclosed moorland or heathland.  These areas are usually unfenced common land on which local people have rights to graze livestock, including their ponies. They are minimally managed:  in some cases the mares are turned out for the whole year and live in small groups often consisting of an older mare, several of her female offspring and their foals (which are born in spring, after a gestation of 11 months).  Small numbers of stallions are allowed to join the mares for a few weeks in spring or early summer. Each stallion then gathers a harem of mares and their foals to form a larger group of 20 or so.  The foals and mares are rounded up in autumn, when the colts and some of the fillies are removed for sale.  The remaining fillies are usually branded to indicate ownership.  Some geldings may also be turned out.  Ponies still kept in this way include New Forest, Exmoor, Dartmoor and Welsh. Fell Ponies are also kept in a semiferal state but managed differently. Each of these breeds also has a population kept as fully domesticated animals.

Showing
In horse shows mountain and moorland classes are divided into two subsections - small breeds and large breeds, although the four Welsh types are often shown in their own classes. They are overseen by the relevant breed society and by the National Pony Society.

Mountain and moorland breeds

Small breeds 

 Shetland Pony from the Shetland Isles off the northern tip of Scotland.
 Exmoor Pony from Exmoor in Somerset and Devon in south-west England.
 Dartmoor Pony from Dartmoor in Devon in south-west England.
  Welsh Mountain Pony (section A) and Welsh Pony (section B) from Wales.

Large breeds 

 Connemara Pony from County Galway in western Ireland.
 Highland Pony from Scotland.  
 Dales Pony from the eastern Pennines of northern England.
 Fell Pony from Cumbria in north-western England.
 New Forest Pony from the New Forest in Hampshire on the south coast of England.
 Welsh Pony (section C) and Welsh Cob (section D) from Wales.

Showing mountain and moorland ponies

Turnout

Mountain and moorland ponies are shown in their ‘native’ state and are not trimmed nor plaited (braided). In reality a little light trimming is commonplace, for example to show off the fine head of the Connemara, and Welsh Ponies often have their manes pulled to a length of about six inches. In some cases trimming is necessary - if a small-breeds pony's tail was left to grow unchecked it would become matted with mud and the pony could stand on it, potentially causing injury to itself or its rider.

Bridles are plain and workmanlike, without coloured browbands or embellishments. A double bridle or a pelham bit is used in open classes and a snaffle bit in novice classes.

Rider dress
Riders wear tweed jackets, canary or buff breeches, shirt and tie, plain gloves, and a navy hat.
Adult riders on large breed ponies wear long boots with garter straps. Adult riders on small-breed ponies must wear jodhpur boots with jodhpur clips. Children wear jodhpur boots with jodhpur clips. Show canes or plain leather whips are carried.

The use of spurs is forbidden in all mountain and moorland classes.

Part-bred classes

Many shows hold classes for part-bred mountain and moorland horses and ponies. In these cases, the horses are turned out according to type - for example hunter pony or riding pony.

Conservation grazing

The mountain and moorland breeds are well-adapted to surviving on poor-quality grazing.  This makes them suitable for use in conservation grazing, the use of livestock to manage land of high ecological value in a natural way.  Pony breeds used in this way in Britain include the Exmoor, Dartmoor, Fell, Welsh, and New Forest (as well as some similar ponies from other parts of Europe such as the Icelandic and Konik).

See also
List of horse breeds

References

 National Pony Society website
 The Native Pony Enthusiasts Community
 The Fell Pony Society
 Fell Pony Breeders Association

External links
 British Connemara Society
 Dales Pony Society
 Dartmoor Pony Society
 The Eriskay Pony Society
 Exmoor Pony Society
 Fell Pony Society
 Highland Pony Society
 The New Forest Pony Breeding Society
 Shetland Pony Stud Book Society
 The Welsh Pony and Cob Society

Fauna of the British Isles
Types of horse